Kumar (Sanskrit: कुमार), meaning child, may be used as a personal title, a given name or a family name. It was also the name of Kartikeya, the son of Shiva.

People

First name 
 Kumar Bhattacharyya, Baron Bhattacharyya (born 1940), Indian-British engineer and politician
 Kumar Mangalam Birla (born 1967), Indian businessman
 Kumar Dharmasena (born 1971), Sri Lankan cricketer
 Kumar Gandharva (1924–1992), Indian singer
 Kumar Gaurav (born 1960), Indian film actor
 Kumar Indrajitsinhji (born 1937), Indian cricketer
 Kumar Malavalli, Indian businessman
 Kumar Pallana (born 1918), Indian film actor
 Kumar Ponnambalam (1940–2000), Sri Lankan lawyer and politician 
 Kumar Sangakkara (born 1977), Sri Lankan cricketer
 Kumar Sanu (born 1957), Indian playback singer 
 Kumar Shahani, Indian film director
 Kumar Shri Duleepsinhji (1905–1959), Indian cricketer
 Kumar Vishwas, Hindi-language performance poet

Middle name 
 Shiv Kumar Batalvi (1936–1973), Indian poet
 Pawan Kumar Chamling (born 1950), Indian politician
 Suniti Kumar Chatterji (1890–1977), Indian linguist
 Akshay Kumar Datta (1820–1886), Bengali writer
 Sunil Kumar Desai, Indian film director
 Ananth Kumar Hegde (born 1968), Indian politician
 Krishna Kumar Kunnath (born 1970), Indian playback singer 
 Hemanta Kumar Mukhopadhyay (1920–1989), Indian singer, composer and producer
 Sushil Kumar Modi, Indian politician 
 Braj Kumar Nehru (1909–2001), Indian politician and diplomat
 Madhav Kumar Nepal (born 1953), Nepalese politician
 Roop Kumar Rathod (born 1973), Indian playback singer and music director
 Tapan Kumar Pradhan (born 1972), Indian bank, activist and poet
 C. Kumar N. Patel (born 1938), Indian engineer and inventor
 Yogesh Kumar Sabharwal (born 1942), Indian judge
 Srinivas Kumar Sinha (born 1926), Indian military officer
 Devendra Kumar Joshi (born 1954), 21st Chief of Naval Staff of the Indian Navy
 Nani Kumar Ghanta (born 1984), Indian Telugu film actor

Last name

A 
 Ajith Kumar (born 1971), Indian film actor and car racer
 Akhil Kumar (born 1981), Indian boxer
 Akshay Kumar (born 1967), Indian film actor
 Amit Kumar (born 1952), Indian film actor, playback singer and director
 Anant Kumar (born 1969), is a German author of Indian descent
 Ananth Kumar (born 1959), Indian politician
 Anil Kumar (discus thrower) (born 1975), Indian discus thrower
 Anoop Kumar (1926–1997), Indian film actor
 Anup Kumar (actor) (1930–1998), Indian film actor 
 Anup Kumar (politician), Fijian politician 
 Anurag Kumar, Indian engineer
 Ashok Kumar (1911–2001), Indian film actor
 Ashok Kumar (British politician) (born 1956), Indian-British politician

B–F 
 Bhushan Kumar, Indian film producer
 Deepak Kumar (historian) (born 1952), Indian historian and philosopher
 Digendra Kumar (born 1969), Indian military officer
 Dilip Kumar (born 1922), Indian film actor and politician 
Dinesh Kumar (boxer) (born 1988), Indian boxer
Dinesh Kumar (choreographer), Indian choreographer
Divya Khosla Kumar, Indian actress

G–J 
 Girish Kumar (born 1989), Indian film actor
 Gulshan Kumar (1956–1997), Indian film producer
 Guran Ditt Kumar, Indian revolutionary
 G. V. Prakash Kumar (born 1987), Indian music score composer
 Hri Kumar, Singaporean politician
 Indra Kumar, Indian film director and producer
 Jainendra Kumar (1905–1988), Indian writer
 Jitender Kumar (middleweight boxer) (born 1977), Indian boxer
 Jitender Kumar (flyweight boxer) (born 1988), Indian boxer

K–O 
 Karthik Kumar (born 1977), Indian theatre and film actor
 Kiran Kumar, Indian film actor
 Kishore Kumar (1929–1987), Indian film actor and playback singer 
 Krishan Kumar (sociologist) (born 1942), British sociologist
 Krishan Kumar (actor), Indian film actor and producer
 Krishna Kumar (actor), Indian film actor
 Manoj Kumar (born 1937), Indian film actor and director
 Meira Kumar (born 1945), Indian politician 
 Mukesh Kumar (field hockey) (born 1970), Indian field hockey player
 Naresh Kumar (born 1928), Indian tennis player
 Nish Kumar, British stand-up comedian
 Nikhil Kumar (disambiguation)
 Nitish Kumar (born 1951), Indian politician
 Pawan Kumar (director), film Director, actor and screenwriter
 Pooja Kumar (model), American film actress and model
 Pradeep Kumar (1925–2001), Bengali film actor
 Praveen Kumar (born 1986), Indian cricketer
 Prem Kumar (Malayalam actor) (born 1967), Indian film actor in Malayalam films
 Prem Kumar (Kannada actor), Indian film actor in Kannada films
 Prem Kumar (footballer) (born 1989), Indian footballer
 Prem Kumar (politician) (born 1960), Indian politician 
 Raaj Kumar (1926–1996), Indian film actor
 Ram Kumar (artist) (born 1924), Indian painter and writer
 Rajendra Kumar (1929–1999), Indian film actor
 Rajesh Kumar (actor), Indian actor
 Ravinder Kumar, Indian historian
 Ritu Kumar, (born 1944), Indian fashion designer
 R. Sarath Kumar (born 1954), Indian film actor and politician
Ravish Kumar (born 1974), Indian Journalist

S 
 Sajjan Kumar (born 1945), Indian politician
 Salesh Kumar (born 1981), Fijian footballer
 Salim Kumar (born 1969), Indian film actor
 Sanjay Kumar (born 1962), Sri Lankan businessman
 Sanjeev Kumar (1938–1985), Indian film actor
 Santosh Kumar, real name: Syed Musa Raza (1925–1982), Pakistani film actor
 Satish Kumar (born 1936), Indian Jain monk and nuclear disarmament advocate
 Shabbir Kumar, Indian playback singer
 Shalini Kumar (born 1980), Indian film actress
 Shanta Kumar (born 1934), Indian politician
 Shivrajkumar (born 1961), Indian film actor
 Shyam Kumar, Indian cricketer
Sujit Kumar (1934-2010), Indian film actor and producer
 Sushil Kumar (admiral) (1940–2019), Indian Navy admiral
 Sushil Kumar (wrestler) (born 1983), Indian wrestler

T–U 
 Tarun Kumar (born 1983), Indian film actor
 Tulsi Kumar, Indian playback singer
 Uttam Kumar (1926–1980), Bengali film actor, director and producer
 U. Vimal Kumar, Indian badminton player

V–Z 
 Vaman Kumar (born 1935), Indian cricketer
 Vedhika Kumar (born 1982), Indian film actress
 Vijender Kumar (born 1985), Indian boxer
 Vijay Kumar (sport shooter), Indian sport shooter
 Vineet Kumar, Indian theatre, television and film actor
 V. Kumar (1934–1996), Indian film score composer
 V. R. Naren Kumar, Indian rally driver 
 Yukteshwar Kumar (born 1970), Indian sinologist

See also
 Raj Kumar (disambiguation)
 Sai Kumar (disambiguation)
 Ananth Kumar (disambiguation)

References

Indian masculine given names